Reef Check is an international non-governmental organization dedicated to the conservation of two reef ecosystems: tropical coral reefs and Californian rocky reefs. The Foundation is headquartered in Los Angeles, California, United States, but uses data from volunteer scuba diver teams in over 80 countries, ranging from Australia, Japan, to even Germany. It is the United Nations’ official coral reef monitoring program.

History
Reef Check first conducted a global survey of coral reef health in 1997. The data confirmed that coral reefs were in crisis due to overfishing, pollution and other human impacts. The published results in 1999 unsettled the coral biologist community, as the extent of impacts were not realized.

"The Global Coral Reef Crisis: Trends and Solutions (1997-2001)", a five-year report on coral reefs, was released in 2002 at the World Summit on Sustainable Development in Johannesburg, South Africa. The report used data collected by thousands of volunteers worldwide, and was the first scientific document detailing the decline in coral reef health over a five-year period.

In 2005, Reef Check launched its first temperate reef program in California.

In 2006, Reef Check conducted 746 reef surveys, ranging from Indo-Pacific areas, the Red Sea and Caribbean Sea.

In 2008, in a presentation made at the International Coral Reef Symposium in Fort Lauderdale, Florida, Reef Check Executive Director Gregor Hodgson announced that coral reefs in the Indo-Pacific region have largely recovered from the devastating bleaching event that killed up to 90% of corals on some reefs in 1998. He reported that 10 years later, recovery has occurred more quickly and more completely than expected. Caribbean reefs, however, are losing about 3% living coral every four years due to a combination of human impacts.

Mission and goals
Reef Check endeavors to create partnerships among communities, government agencies, businesses, universities and other non-profits. Reef Check's mission is "to protect and rehabilitate reefs worldwide".

Reef Check's goals are: 
to educate the public about the value of reef ecosystems and the current crisis affecting marine life
to create a global network of volunteer teams trained in Reef Check's scientific methods who regularly monitor and report on reef health
to facilitate collaboration that produces ecologically sound and economically sustainable solutions
to stimulate local community action to protect remaining pristine reefs and rehabilitate damaged reefs worldwide

Monitoring methods

Reef Check volunteer divers are trained to study a designated site annually or sometimes quarterly. Underwater surveyors focus chiefly on sessile invertebrates (benthos), along a  transect line.

Four spatial replicates (spanning ) are studied with three  gaps between. The survey is sub-divided to allow paired divers to separately observe substrate, photograph macroinvertebrates and impacts, record video, and count fishes. A site-specific description is also documented.

Programs
Reef Check carries out its work through three major programs:

 EcoAction Program – an education and certification program for kids and adults who want to learn more about the ocean and take part in protecting reef ecosystems.
 Coral Reef Management Program – a coral reef monitoring and management system that focuses on establishing Marine Protected Areas to conserve coral reefs while encouraging sustainable use of surrounding reefs by local residents.
 Reef Check California – a volunteer monitoring program for California rocky reefs designed to provide data for managers and to build a conservation constituency among California divers.

See also

References

Further reading 
Joyce, K.E., Phinn, SR, Roelfsema, CM, Neil, DT and WC Dennison.  2004.  Combining Landsat ETM plus and Reef Check classifications for mapping coral reefs: A critical assessment from the southern Great Barrier Reef, Australia. Journal of Coral Reefs. Vol 23, Issue 1. pp 21–25. Springer Publ, New York, NY.

External links
Official Website
Reef Check Australia (Australian counterpart)
Reef Check Dominican Republic (Dominican Republic counterpart)
Global Coral Reef Monitoring Network (GCRMN)
International Coral Reef Initiative (ICRI)
Reef Environmental Education Foundation (REEF)
International Coral Reef Action Network (ICRAN)

Nature conservation organizations based in the United States
Coral reefs
Diving organizations
International environmental organizations
Organizations established in 1996